The National Library of Nigeria came into operation in the mid-1960s with the enactment of the National Library Act of 1964 which was later replaced by Act No. 29 of 1970. Prior to the passage of the National Library act, a series of educational conferences conducted in Ibadan served as the intellectual basis for the creation of a network of libraries funded by the federal government to provide accessibility of educational materials to Nigerians. A government advisory committee was later created in respect to the necessity to develop a local repository of knowledge. The committee was charged with finding a way to aid the government in bringing to prominence the intellectual foundations of its policies, creation of a national bibliographic center and to provide an arena for the promotion of knowledge. The committee was the first major formal body that called for a National Library as part of its recommendations. The government accepted the demands of the advisory committee and undertook the necessary steps to build a National Library.

History and organization
The construction of the library began in 1962 and it was finally opened for public use on 6 November 1964. The headquarters was moved from Lagos to Abuja in 1995.

The Library Act enacted by the House of Representatives of Nigeria guaranteed financial assistance to the project, the Act also provided provisions for the training of staff and the creation of a board of directors made up of professionals. In accordance with the demands of the Nigerian republic and the assembly, a group of 15 trained librarians were hired to provide a positive role in developing and manning the library. A board was inaugurated in April 1966 by a new military government. The board was made up of government officials instead of professionals as written on the original act. However, the board tried to improve on the original objectives of the library but the Nigerian Civil War hampered funding and formal government actions were not taken until 1970. In 1970, a new legal precedent was set with the creation of the National Library decree. The decree was partly enacted on the advice of the board which wanted to expand the library to other state capitals in order to create a network of repositories.

Mission
The Library is funded by the Federal Government of Nigeria. Originally, the Ford Foundation was involved with the project. The foundation brought in professionals, donated books and funded the library's expansion. The library over the years has built on its original mission. Today, it is a vital organ that acts as the intellectual memory of the nation. The library provides the intellectual ammunition to aid government officers in policy implementation. However, the general direction of policy instability due to the military incursion to power sometimes created an imbalance between the intellectual memory of prior policies and the intellectual foundation of a new government. The library also stays afloat intellectually by receiving copies of books published in the country by both the government and private authorities through the legal deposit provision in the Library Act. This makes the library one of the largest depositories of knowledge in the country. It also collects publications on contemporary or new ideas from international organizations.

The responsibilities of the institution also includes issuing of the ISBN (International Standard Book Number) and ISSN (International Standard Serials Number) to publishing organizations, a process which was formerly cumbersome in the absence of appropriate technology at the regional offices but is getting easier with more awareness and infusion of mobile technology.

Furthermore, as part of its mandate, the library runs an annual Readership Promotion Campaign all over the country to create awareness about the importance of literacy and to get the citizenry reading.

Challenges
The National Library of Nigeria has challenges that inhibit it from fulfilling its stated objectives.

 Dilapidated facilities and resources which are as a result of inadequate funding.
 The library headquarters operates from rented apartments as the complex which is meant to house it remains uncompleted since it was started in 2006. 
 The library has 33 branches and is making efforts to effectively expand to the 36 state capitals of the federation as designated by the library decree of 1970. 
 Poor reading culture in Nigeria is also a challenge as this spawns a nonchalant attitude to the growth of the library while hindering the uses of its facilities and services. 
 Inadequate and non progressive staff training to keep the professionals abreast of current best practices in the ever-evolving information sector especially as pertains to use of technology to organize resources and offer services.
 Outdated materials are found in the library, hardly will you get new materials.

Branches
Locations:

Chief Executive Officer 
Prof. Chinwe Veronica Anunobi was appointed as chief executive officer of the library on 8 September 2021. She has served as the University Librarian of Federal University of Technology, Owerri, Imo State.  She is a member of the Governing Council of African Library and Information Associations and Institutions (AfLIA) where she is serving her second term and represents the entire West Africa region. She took over from Prof. Lenrie Olatokunbo Aina who was the chief executive officer of the National Library of Nigeria from 2016 to 2021.

See also
National Library
List of Libraries in Nigeria
 National Archives of Nigeria
 List of National Libraries

References

Further reading
 

http://www.unn.edu.ng/publications/files/images/thomas%20T..pdf

External links

https://unesdoc.unesco.org/ark:/48223/pf0000088675

Nigeria
1964 establishments in Nigeria
Libraries established in 1964
Organizations based in Abuja
Libraries in Nigeria